Rudolf Flotzinger (born 22 September 1939) is an Austrian musicologist.

Career 
Born in Vorchdorf (Austria), Flotzinger graduated from the  where he was a student from 1951 to 1958. He then pursued concurrent studies at the Academy of Fine Arts Vienna (1958–1964) and the University of Vienna (1959–1964). At the Academy of Fine Arts he studied music composition with Karl Schiske, and at the University of Vienna he studied musicology with Erich Schenk and Walter Graf.

In 1964 Flotzinger's doctoral dissertation on lute tablatures in Kremsmünster, Die Lautentabulaturen des Stiftes Kremsmünster, was published by the University of Vienna, and he received his doctorate from that institution in 1965. He remained at that institution doing further research and teaching, and received his habilitation at the University of Vienna in 1969 following his scholarly research into early music at the Notre-Dame de Paris.

In 1971 Flotzinger left Vienna to succeed Othmar Wessely as chairman of the institute for musicology of the University of Graz.

As a musicologist, Flotzinger has mainly published content and pursued research in the areas of medieval music (particularly early polyphony) and the music history of Austria. From 1992 until 1999 he was editor of the journal Acta musicologica. He also co-edited  the three-volume Musikgeschichte Österreichs and was editor of the five-volume Oesterreichisches Musiklexikon in addition to serving as a member of the Academia Europaea in London as well as corresponding member of the Academy of Sciences in Vienna, Zagreb and Ljubljana.

References

External links 
 
 
On the Question of Modal Rhythm as Reception by Rudolf Flotzinger

1939 births
Living people
People from Gmunden District
Austrian musicologists
Members of the Austrian Academy of Sciences
Academic staff of the University of Vienna
Academic staff of the University of Graz
Members of Academia Europaea
Members of the Slovenian Academy of Sciences and Arts
Members of the Croatian Academy of Sciences and Arts
University of Vienna alumni